Bouteloua repens, colloquially known as slender grama, is a grass species in the grama genus native to the southwestern United States and northern Mexico.

Description 

Slender grama is a perennial grass that appears similar to Bouteloua chondrosioides. Its flowers are borne in inflorescences at the tip of culms in groups of four to twelve. The central lobe has an extended awn. The glumes are hairless. It does not form rhizomes. It is exceptionally resistant to cattle grazing.

Distribution 
Slender grama prefers dry rocky slopes below , but will also tolerate most open areas of mixed soil types and can be found up . It is present in much of Arizona, as well as into Texas, New Mexico, and Mexico. It is also found in the Caribbean, and Central America as far south as Colombia and Venezuela.

References 

repens
Grasses of North America
Grasses of Mexico
Grasses of the United States
Drought-tolerant plants
Warm-season grasses of North America
Grasses of South America